Paradise is an unincorporated community in Beaver Township, Mahoning County, Ohio, United States.

Notes

Unincorporated communities in Mahoning County, Ohio
Unincorporated communities in Ohio